Frederick Herman Tuttle (July 18, 1919 – October 4, 2003) was an American dairy farmer, actor, United States Army veteran of World War II, and Republican candidate for the United States Senate from Vermont in 1998. He lived in Tunbridge all his life, and attended South Royalton High School before dropping out after the tenth grade to begin a career as a dairy farmer.  He served in the U.S. Army during World War II, and participated in military actions in the European Theater.

Tuttle retired from farming in 1984, and continued to reside in Tunbridge, where he engaged in gardening and other hobbies.  Tuttle was a neighbor of filmmaker John O'Brien, who recognized that Tuttle's charisma and unique personality might come across well on film.  As a result, he cast Tuttle in movie roles including parts in Nosey Parker and Man with a Plan.  In 1998, Tuttle and O'Brien decided that a Tuttle candidacy for public office might help publicize Man with a Plan, a mock documentary which centers on the idea of a retired farmer (Tuttle) running for the United States House of Representatives because it is easier and pays better than farming.  They decided to run for the Republican nomination to oppose Senator Patrick Leahy, in part to promote the film, and in part to poke fun at Jack McMullen, a recent arrival to Vermont, who was accused of moving to the state because it would be easier to campaign for a United States Senate seat there than in his home state of Massachusetts.

Tuttle defeated McMullen after a campaign of humorous and memorable incidents.  He then announced that he had no intention of leaving Tunbridge or serving in the Senate, and endorsed Leahy for reelection.  They made several joint appearances, and Leahy easily won reelection in November.  The campaign added to Tuttle's growing status as a folk figure and cult hero, and a steady stream of public appearances followed.  He died in 2003, and was buried in Tunbridge.

Early life
Tuttle was born in Tunbridge, Vermont, the son of Bessie Laura (Hoyt) and Joseph Charles Tuttle. He lived in Tunbridge all his life, except for his military service.  He attended the schools of Tunbridge, and completed tenth grade at South Royalton High School before going to work on his family's dairy farm.

Military service
Tuttle served in the United States Army during World War II.  He participated in military actions in Europe, first with the Military Police, and then Army Corps of Engineers.

Post-World War II
In 1947, Tuttle married Ida May Foote (1916-2000) in Canterbury, New Hampshire.  They divorced and in 1953, Tuttle married Charlotte Lorraine Perry (1929-1999) in White River Junction, Vermont.   He married Dorothy L. (Hilts) (1929-2011) in Maine in 1961.

Later career
Tuttle retired from farming in 1984 and engaged in gardening and other hobbies. After his retirement, he appeared in several movies directed by Vermont filmmaker John O'Brien, including Nosey Parker and Man with a Plan. He starred in the latter, playing a retired farmer who decides to run for U.S. Representative from Vermont.

In 1998, Tuttle was persuaded to run in the Republican U.S. Senate primary. His opponent was Jack McMullen, a multi-millionaire who had lived in Massachusetts for most of his adult life. McMullen faced opposition from some Vermont Republicans who felt that he was a carpetbagger who apparently moved to Vermont for the sole purpose of establishing residency for a Senate run. The Vermont primary structure allows Democrats and Independents to vote in the Republican primary, and many people foresaw the possibility that Tuttle would beat McMullen by drawing votes across party lines. In addition, some may have hoped that a Tuttle campaign would help to publicize the film Man with a Plan.

Tuttle campaigned on a platform that seemed absurdist by the standards of contemporary politics. McMullen and the state Republican Party challenged Tuttle's ballot petition and got 95 of his signatures invalidated. Tuttle needed 23 more to stay on the ballot and he received 2,309 more signatures. McMullen then gave flowers to Tuttle in the hospital while Tuttle was there for knee surgery.

During the radio-broadcast debate, Tuttle asked a series of humorous local knowledge questions rather than political questions. McMullen was unable to correctly pronounce the names of several Vermont towns, or correctly answer Fred's question "How many teats a Holstein got?" answering "Six", instead of the correct four. In the primary, Tuttle defeated McMullen by ten percentage points. Winning the primary with 55 percent of the vote, Tuttle promptly endorsed the incumbent Democrat, Patrick Leahy.

Tuttle's subsequent election campaign against Leahy saw him continue to receive publicity. He continued to endorse Leahy, saying of him, "He knows how many tits on a cow." Tuttle commented that he did not really want to win because he would have to move to Washington, D.C. Despite his endorsement of his opponent, Tuttle garnered 48,051 votes (22 percent of the vote) in the actual election.

Tuttle was described by Senator Leahy as "the distilled essence of Vermonthood". He was considered by many to be an example of both the "everyman" and of the unique individualist.

Death and burial
Tuttle died in Burlington, Vermont, after being hospitalized with a heart attack following a day spent digging potatoes at his home in Tunbridge. He was buried at Tunbridge's Spring Road Cemetery wearing his overalls, with a pen in his pocket for autograph signing and a can of Moxie by his side.

Electoral history

Notes

External links

1919 births
2003 deaths
American Protestants
People from Tunbridge, Vermont
Military personnel from Vermont
Vermont culture
United States Army personnel of World War II
Farmers from Vermont
United States Army soldiers
Burials in Vermont
Vermont Republicans
Dairy farmers